Legend of the Wolf, alternatively known as The New Big Boss in American and British DVD releases, is a 1997 Hong Kong action-martial arts film directed and produced by, and starring Donnie Yen. The film also marked Yen's debut as a film director.

Plot
In legend, there is a powerful and undefeated warrior known as the Wolf. This fighter has retired from the martial arts world and very few people know his true identity, but they are many who wish to challenge him. A young man seeks the Wolf and manages to contact Wai, who leads him to the warrior. When the young man sees that the Wolf (real name Fung Man-hin) is an old man, far from what he expected, he makes some sarcastic remarks to ridicule the old man, prompting Wai to retell the story of the Wolf.

The film flashbacks to a post-World War II period. The young Fung is wandering around a war-torn and ravaged farming village, faintly remembering that he is there to meet a woman at an abandoned temple. Fung encounters the young villager Wai, who leads him to his destination. The villagers are suspicious about Fung's background and follow him to the temple, where they see Fung engaging six members of a notorious gang in a fierce fight. Although Fung manages to defeat his opponents, he is severely injured and Wai brings him to a quiet spot for recovery. Just then, Fung remembers that the woman he is meeting is actually his lover, Yee.

In the meantime, the gangsters attack the village and kill many innocent people. When Fung and Wai arrive on the scene, they see corpses everywhere and learn that Yee has been captured by the gang. Fung pursues the gangsters and meets the second leader of the gang, who calls him "Third brother". At that point, Fung suddenly remembers that he is actually part of the gang. Fung is unable to tolerate the gang's cruel acts towards innocent civilians and he fights with the gangsters, emerging victorious eventually.

The film moves back to the present-day conversation between Fung (old man), Wai and the young man. The young man reveals that he is actually an upstart killer, and wishes to make his name by slaying the legendary Wolf. He draws his gun and attempts to kill the Wolf, but does not succeed and is defeated by the Wolf immediately.

Cast
Donnie Yen as Fung Man-hin
Carman Lee as Yee
Dayo Wong as Wai
Edmond Leung as young killer
Ben Lam as gang boss
Mak Wai-cheung as monkey-style fighter
Lai Suk-yin
Tony Tam
Tanigaki Kenji
Mandy Chan
Sam Hoh
Chiu Wing-hoi
Cub Chin
Lee Tat-chiu
Renee Dai

References

External links

HKMDB
HK Cinemagic
LoveHKFilm

See also
Donnie Yen filmography

1997 films
1997 action films
1997 directorial debut films
1997 martial arts films
1990s Cantonese-language films
Hong Kong martial arts films
Hong Kong action films
1990s Hong Kong films